Adela croesella is a moth of the family Adelidae. It is found in most of Europe.

The wingspan is 11–14 mm. Head ferruginous mixed with black. Antennae in male 2.5 black, tip white ; in female hardly 1.5, thickened with violet-black scales to above middle, remainder white. Forewings shining dark violet fuscous, more or less streaked suffusely between veins with golden - ochreous ; a straight deep yellow fascia close beyond middle, narrower costally, edged first with dark fuscous and then with narrow violet fasciae. Hindwings dark purplish
fuscous.

Adults are on wing from late May to June. They are on wing  during the day in sunshine and visit flowers.

At first, the larvae probably feed on flowers of Hippophae rhamnoides or Ligustrum vulgare. Older larvae built a portable case from leaf fragments and particles of soil and feed on fallen leaves.

Gallery

References

External links 

Bestimmungshilfe für die in Europa nachgewiesenen Schmetterlingsarten
 UKmoths
 Fauna Europaea

Adelidae
Moths of Europe
Moths described in 1763
Moths of Asia
Taxa named by Giovanni Antonio Scopoli